Adaptive Behavior is a bimonthly peer-reviewed scientific journal that covers the field of adaptive behavior in living organisms and autonomous artificial systems. It was established in 1992 and is the official journal of the International Society of Adaptive Behavior. It is published by SAGE Publications.

The editor-in-chief is Tom Froese (Okinawa Institute of Science and Technology).

Abstracting and indexing
The journal is abstracted and indexed in Scopus, the Science Citation Index Expanded, and the Social Sciences Citation Index. According to the Journal Citation Reports, the journal has a 2020 impact factor of 1.942.

References

External links

Artificial intelligence publications
SAGE Publishing academic journals
Publications established in 1992
English-language journals
Bimonthly journals
Computer science journals